El Cantón de San Pablo is a municipality and town in the Chocó Department, Colombia.

Climate
El Cantón de San Pablo has a very wet tropical rainforest climate (Af). The following data is for Managrú, the capital of the municipality.

References

Municipalities of Chocó Department